Castañares de las Cuevas is a ghost town in the municipality of Viguera, in the province and autonomous community of La Rioja, Spain.

References

Populated places in La Rioja (Spain)